The Yamaha XS Eleven motorcycle, also called XS11 and XS1100, is a Japanese standard produced from 1978 to 1981, powered by an air-cooled  4-stroke, DOHC inline four-cylinder engine mounted transversely in a duplex cradle frame with swingarm rear suspension, shaft drive, and telescopic forks.

North American models
The XS Eleven made its debut in 1978 as the largest capacity then in production. It featured dual front disc brakes, a rear disc brake, shaft drive and cast wheels.

In 1979, Yamaha followed the growing trend of offering a "factory custom" version of the bike, called a "Special" by Yamaha. Pullback handlebars, a stepped seat, a smaller, fatter rear wheel, a smaller capacity tear-drop gas tank, fully adjustable suspension, and altered frame created a factory custom, forerunner of the modern cruiser. The XS Eleven Special sold well despite complaints about the poor ergonomics. "What that translates to is a bike with an awkward riding position but generally excellent road manners. In fact, most of the things that irritated this staff in the way the bike rode and handled could be traced to the handlebar, which, although certainly as trendy as disco dancing, was not what the ergonomics doctor ordered for precise, comfortable control."

For the 1981 model year, an even more touring oriented version of the XS Eleven was produced. This model, dubbed the Venturer was equipped with a fairing made by Pacifico for Yamaha. Venturers included matching trunk and hard bags. Additionally, the Venturer included a 6.3 gallon tank for increased range while touring.

XS Eleven models were superseded by the 1982 XJ1100 Maxim which used an engine based very closely on the XS1100 unit. The XJ1100 Maxim was only built for one year, before being phased out.

European market
In Europe, the XS Eleven differed from the North American model by having a larger petrol tank (6.3 US gallons vs. 5.3 US gallons), a lower handlebar and longer exhaust pipes. The European market also featured the 1.1 Sport with small cockpit fairing, and Martini 1.1 complete with the two piece Mockett fairing (designed by John Mockett), with colour scheme similar to the bike that Mike Hailwood used as his personal transport at the 1978 Isle of Man TT.

History
The XS Eleven was the first four-cylinder four-stroke motorcycle from Yamaha.  It exploited well-proven technology, first used by Yamaha in their previously released XS 750 four-stroke triple. When the XS Eleven was introduced, it earned a reputation as a heavy, powerful bike. In 1978 and 1979 it won Cycle Worlds Ten Best Bikes as the best Touring bike.

"Nobody gets far riding the XS Eleven before they become acquainted with the fact that it's strong; we had ridden ours over hundreds of open-road miles before going to the drag strip and knew it was a bullet." Cycle Magazine had this to say of the Eleven: "...the XS is a Rolls Royce with a blown Chrysler Hemi motor..."

The handling of the XS Eleven was not as well received. "When this behemoth of a motorcycle actually hits a corner at anything approaching interesting speeds then it takes a good deal of muscle to lay it down. While the Yamaha doesn't disgrace itself in corners (not as much as some Z1000s I have known, for example) it doesn't commend itself either." Testers of the day all echoed the same story: "The XS1100 was a solid bullet in a straight line, but cornering at high speeds was done at your own risk."  "Cycle warned its readers that the bike could easily go, stop and steer — just never two at the same time." 'Which Bike' magazine simply described the XS1100 as having 'a bullet proof motor, and tea trolley handling'.

Racing: Production and Modified Classes
The XS11 dominated the 1978 Australian motorcycle production racing circuit in 1978 and continued to victories and high place finishes in production and superbike classes through 1981. The XS Eleven's win at the 1978 Castrol Six Hour production endurance race by the Pittman's Team of Jim Budd and Roger Heyes was Yamaha's first four stroke motorcycle road racing victory at a major international event. "A key component of the race from the very start was that the motorcycles had to be completely stock, exactly as available the day after the race in dealers’ showrooms around the world, and they were rigorously inspected in both pre-race and post-race scrutineering to ensure that they were" 

Flack of Motor Sport Retro wrote: "While the new CBX1000 and Suzuki were out and out sports bikes, the shaft-drive XS1100, affectionately called the 'Xcessive', was more of a muscle bike come tourer. Heavier than and not as fast as its rivals, the XS1100 did have one particular ability – winning races."

"In the lead up to the Six-Hour, the XS1100 had swept the Adelaide Three-Hour, the Perth Four-Hour and the Surfers Three-Hour. The unlikely XS1100 and Pitman Yamaha rider Greg Pretty had upstaged the biggest, baddest production bikes around, confounding everyone."

In the 1979 Castrol 6 hour, XS Elevens finished second (Greg Pretty, Jim Budd) third (Len Atlee, Gary Coleman) and fourth (Roger Heyes and D. Robbins)

The XS Eleven's successful racing career was a remarkable achievement considering its shaft drive and long distance touring capabilities.

British motorcycle journalist Roland Brown, says in his book Superbikes of the Seventies: "The Yamaha's lack of reputation gives it one advantage these days, though, in that a clean XS such as this one costs less than its more successful contemporary rivals – whose performance advantage, so crucial then, is far less important now. Two decades and more after its launch, maybe the XS1100's time has finally come."

Performance
In a 1978 test by Cycle World a stock XS1100 ran a quarter mile time of 11.78 s 1/4 mile @.

Gallery

See also 
 Yamaha XS750 
 Yamaha XS650

References

XS Eleven
Motorcycles introduced in 1978
Shaft drive motorcycles